Habib Ullah Khan (31 January 1935 – 7 January 2023) was a Bangladeshi politician and diplomat. He served as the Minister of Information and then as the Minister of Jute under the Bangladesh Nationalist Party (BNP) governments in the late 1970s to early 1980s. He was also a former Member of the Jatiya Sangsad representing Comilla-5 (now Brahmanbaria-5).

Personal life 
Khan was born on 31 January 1935 in Nabinagar, Bengal Presidency. His father was Abdus Shakur Khan.

Khan was married to Salma Khan, who was a diplomat and served as an ambassador of Bangladesh to Indonesia. She died on July 2022. They were survived by their only daughter, Humana Khan.

Career
As a politician, Khan joined the Bangladesh Nationalist Party (BNP) and contested in the 18 February 1979 general election from Comilla-5 (now Brahmanbaria-5) and was elected as an MP for the 2nd parliament. The parliament's first session sat on 2 April 1979. During his time as MP, he first served as the Minister of Information and Broadcasting under Ziaur Rahman and after the assassination of Rahman, he served as the Minister of Textiles and Jute under Abdus Sattar's new cabinet. He continued his post until the 1982 coup d'état.

In his diplomatic career, he is highly notable for being the first ambassador of Bangladesh to South Africa as Bangladesh established ties with the country after the election of Nelson Mandela and the end of apartheid.

Khan was also associated with some social and human development organizations. He was one of the founders of 'Assistance for Blind Children (ABC)', which is a Bangladeshi NGO for blind children. He was a former district governor of Rotary International in Bangladesh.

Death 
Khan died at Dhaka's Evercare Hospital around 5:45 PM (BDT).

References

Bangladesh Nationalist Party politicians
Living people
2nd Jatiya Sangsad members
1935 births